A Commuter Kind of Love is a 1979 Norwegian drama film directed by Hans Otto Nicolayssen, starring Eilif Armand, Frøydis Armand and Per Jansen. It takes place on a small island off the coast of north-western Norway, where people deal with such various problems as rural flight, alcohol- and pill abuse, and abortion.

External links
 
 Kjærleikens ferjereiser at Filmweb.no (Norwegian)

1979 films
1979 drama films
Norwegian drama films